

Central bank
 National Bank of Georgia

Commercial banks
As of May 8, 2022, there are 14 commercial banks operating in Georgia.

Former commercial banks
 International Bank of Azerbaijan - Georgia 
 Caucasus Development Bank 
 FINCA Bank

References

Banks

Banks
Georgia
Georgia (country)
Georgia (country)